George William Taylor,  (born November 5, 1937) is a former politician in Ontario, Canada. He served in the Legislative Assembly of Ontario from 1977 to 1985, and was a cabinet minister in the government of William Davis. Taylor was a member of the Progressive Conservative Party.

Background
Taylor was born in Hamilton, Ontario, and educated at McMaster University (received a Bachelor of Arts degree in 1960) and the Osgoode Hall Law School. He practiced as a lawyer in Barrie, taught business law at Georgian College for ten years, and was named a Queen's Counsel in 1977. As of 2005, he is director of the United Appeal in Barrie, director of the Barrie YM-YWCA and campaign chairman for the Canadian Cancer Society.  He also plays with the Barrie Oldtimers Hockey Team.

Politics
He was elected to the Ontario legislature in the 1977 provincial election, defeating New Democratic Party candidate Paul Wessenger by 5,434 votes in Simcoe Centre.  He served as a government backbench supporter for the next four years, and was re-elected in the 1981 election.  He was named to Davis's cabinet on February 13, 1982 as Solicitor General. Taylor supported Larry Grossman's bid to succeed Davis as party leader, and was dropped from cabinet when Frank Miller became Premier of Ontario on February 8, 1985.  He did not run for re-election in 1985.

Cabinet

After politics
Taylor returned to his legal practice after leaving the legislature. In 2001, he was appointed to the Ontario Rental Housing Tribunal by the government of Mike Harris.

References

External links

1937 births
Living people
Members of the Executive Council of Ontario
Politicians from Hamilton, Ontario
Progressive Conservative Party of Ontario MPPs
Canadian King's Counsel